Suzana Ferreira da Silva (born 12 October 1973) is a Brazilian former football midfielder who played for the Brazil women's national football team at the 1999 FIFA Women's World Cup in the United States and 2000 Summer Olympics in Sydney, Australia. At the time of the 1999 World Cup she was playing for São Paulo FC.

See also
 Brazil at the 2000 Summer Olympics

References

External links
 
 Profile at sports-reference.com

1973 births
Living people
Brazilian women's footballers
Place of birth missing (living people)
Footballers at the 2000 Summer Olympics
Olympic footballers of Brazil
Women's association football midfielders
1999 FIFA Women's World Cup players
Brazil women's international footballers
São Paulo FC (women) players